The FTSE Italia Mid Cap is a stock market index for the Borsa Italiana, the main stock exchange of Italy.  It is one of the indices in the FTSE Italia Index Series.

Components 

The index consists of    listings

See also
 FTSE MIB

References

External links 
 Constituents from Borsa Italiana
 Bloomberg

Italian stock market indices
FTSE Group stock market indices